Richard John Vasko (born January 12, 1957) is a Canadian former professional ice hockey defenceman who played in the National Hockey League for the Detroit Red Wings.

Career
As a youth, Vasko played in the 1970 Quebec International Pee-Wee Hockey Tournament with a minor ice hockey team from Cedar Hill, Toronto.

Vasko was drafted 37th overall by the Detroit Red Wings in the 1977 NHL amateur draft and 53rd overall by the Indianapolis Racers in the 1977 WHA Amateur Draft. He went on to play 31 regular season games for the Red Wings over three seasons.

Career statistics

Regular season and playoffs

References

External links

Rick Vasko's Bio on Hockey Draft Central.com

1957 births
Adirondack Red Wings players
Detroit Red Wings draft picks
Detroit Red Wings players
Ice hockey people from Ontario
Indianapolis Racers draft picks
Kansas City Red Wings players
Living people
Oklahoma City Stars players
Peterborough Petes (ice hockey) players
Sportspeople from St. Catharines
Canadian ice hockey defencemen